Witsanu Huadpradit (born 11 November 1983) is a Thai boccia player who represented Thailand at the 2012 and 2020 Summer Paralympics. At the 2012 Paralympics games in London, he won a gold medal in Boccia in the mixed team BC1–2 event.

References

External links
 

1983 births
Living people
Witsanu Huadpradit
Witsanu Huadpradit
Witsanu Huadpradit
Paralympic medalists in boccia
Medalists at the 2012 Summer Paralympics
Medalists at the 2020 Summer Paralympics
Boccia players at the 2012 Summer Paralympics
Boccia players at the 2020 Summer Paralympics
Witsanu Huadpradit
Sportspeople with cerebral palsy